Tyne and Wear Fire and Rescue Service, formerly known as the Tyne and Wear Metropolitan Fire Brigade, is the fire and rescue service (FRS) for the metropolitan boroughs of Newcastle Upon Tyne, Gateshead, North Tyneside, South Tyneside and Sunderland, serving a population of 1.14million people across an area of .
Tyne and Wear Fire and Rescue Authority is responsible for the running of the service, as well as the publication of performance indicators in accordance with its legal obligations. In April 2017, Chris Lowther was appointed chief fire officer.

History 
Tyne and Wear FRS was established as Tyne and Wear Metropolitan Fire Brigade in 1974 as a result of changes to area boundaries within the north east of England. Essentially, a fire service did exist through delivery of several smaller fire services established under the Fire Brigades Act 1938 which made it a requirement for local authorities to provide fire cover to their area, although the smaller services were never united as one service as they are today until 1974. During the second World War, all local fire services in the region and on a national level created under the 1938 legislation were nationalised to form the National Fire Service, remaining this way until the Fire Services Act 1947 which handed control back of fire cover back to local authorities in 1948. When the service was established in 1974, it brought together four small local fire services and parts of two others – Durham County Fire Brigade, Northumberland County Fire Brigade, Newcastle and Gateshead Fire Brigade, Sunderland Fire Brigade, and South Shields and Tynemouth Fire Brigade – to form the service that exists today.

In June 2003, then Deputy Prime Minister John Prescott submitted a white paper to Parliament outlining reforms to the fire service in the UK. Part of the reforms outlined included changing the name of fire services across the UK to 'fire and rescue service', giving greater emphasis to the changing role of the fire service. In 2004, following further government publications, the name of the service was changed from Tyne and Wear Metropolitan Fire Brigade to Tyne and Wear Fire and Rescue Service, with post-2004 vehicle livery and all other parts of the service reflecting the name change. In 2006, the service had built six new fire stations under the Public Private Partnership initiative, replacing older fire stations that were in need of extensive upgrade; the service had also built a new headquarters in Washington to replace the previous headquarters on Pilgrim Street in the centre of Newcastle as well as a new Technical Services building. In 2011, the location for the new Sunderland North fire station in Fulwell was announced, with the station expected to be opened in late 2014 and replacing the current station nearby.

Performance
In 2018/2019, every fire and rescue service in England and Wales was subjected to a statutory inspection by Her Majesty's Inspectorate of Constabulary and Fire & Rescue Services (HIMCFRS). The inspection investigated how well the service performs in each of three areas. On a scale of outstanding, good, requires improvement and inadequate, Tyne and Wear Fire and Rescue Service was rated as follows:

Fire stations
The service divides its area into three geographical zones. All fire stations, apart from two which are noted below, are wholetime-crewed:

North

West

East

See also 
Fire services in the United Kingdom
FiReControl
List of British firefighters killed in the line of duty

References

External links 

 
Tyne and Wear Fire and Rescue Service at HMICFRS
 

Fire and rescue services of England
Organizations established in 1974
Organisations based in Tyne and Wear
1974 establishments in England